John C. Kacere (23 June 1920 – 5 August 1999) was an American artist. Originally an abstract expressionist, Kacere adopted a photorealist style in 1963. Nearly all of his photorealist paintings depict the midsection of the female body. He is considered one of the original photorealists, although he rejected the term.

Biography 
John Kacere was born to a Lebanese-American family in Iowa in 1920. He earned his B.F.A. and his M.F.A. from the University of Iowa in 1949 and 1950 respectively.

Kacere painted his first photorealist painting in 1969 involving the midsection of a woman dressed in lingerie. It was over three times life size. In 1978 one of his paintings was used as the cover of musician  Jorge Santana's first album (Jorge Santana is the younger brother of famous Carlos Santana).  Kacere continued this type of painting throughout the rest of his career, making it an icon of the photorealism movement.  In the early 1980s, Kacere branched away from this theme and included the entire body of a woman in lingerie, but returned to his original midsection of the female body in 1988. Kacere's paintings are figurative but can be considered still lifes or even landscapes.

He began his teaching career in 1950 at the University of Manitoba in Winnipeg, Canada. He also taught at the University of Florida, Arizona State University, the Rhode Island School of Design, New York University, the University of New Mexico, and Cooper Union and the Parsons School of Design in New York City.

His paintings are in the public collections of several institutions, including the Stedelijik Museum in Amsterdam, the Portland Museum of Art, and the Speed Art Museum in Louisville, Kentucky.

He died in 1999 from Alzheimer's disease.

Notes

External links
 
 Some samples of John Kacere work at Rogallery

1920 births
1999 deaths
Deaths from Alzheimer's disease
People from Linn County, Iowa
American people of Lebanese descent
20th-century American painters
American male painters
Photorealist artists
University of Iowa alumni
20th-century American male artists